Dille is a surname. Notable people with the surname include:

A. B. Dille, American football and basketball player and coach
Bob Dille (1917–1998), American basketball player and coach
Flint Dille (born 1955), American screenwriter and video game designer
Steve Dille (1945–2020), American veterinarian and politician
Willie Dille (1965–2018), Dutch politician

See also
Dille, West Virginia, unincorporated community